Saint-Geniez-d'Olt-et-d'Aubrac is a commune in the department of Aveyron, southern France. The municipality was established on 1 January 2016 by merger of the former communes of Saint-Geniez-d'Olt and Aurelle-Verlac.

Population

See also 
Communes of the Aveyron department

References 

Communes of Aveyron
Populated places established in 2016